Horsehouse is a small village in Coverdale in the Yorkshire Dales, North Yorkshire, England. The River Cover runs near the village. The village is home to St. Botolph's Church, a Grade II listed building built in 1869, and the Thwaite Arms public house, built in 1808.

References

External links

Villages in North Yorkshire
Coverdale (dale)